Messua is a spider genus of the family Salticidae (jumping spiders).

Etymology
The genus name is derived from Messua, a female character from Rudyard Kipling's Jungle Book. Other salticid genera with names of Kipling's characters are  Akela, Bagheera and Nagaina.

Taxonomy
The genus was first described in 1896 by American arachnologists George and Elizabeth Peckham based on the type species Messua desidiosa.

The genus Messua was synonymized with Zygoballus by Eugène Simon in 1903. After examining the type specimen for Messua desidiosa, Simon commented that it was "much less divergent from typical Zygoballus than [the Peckhams'] description would indicate." This was reversed by Wayne Maddison in 1996, and Messua restored as a valid genus. Maddison also transferred several species that had previously been placed in Metaphidippus into Messua.

Species
 Messua centralis (Peckham & Peckham, 1896) – Panama
 Messua dentigera (F. O. P-Cambridge, 1901) – Guatemala to Panama
 Messua desidiosa Peckham & Peckham, 1896 – Costa Rica, Panama
 Messua donalda (Kraus, 1955) – El Salvador
 Messua latior (Roewer, 1955) – Panama
 Messua laxa (Chickering, 1946) – Panama
 Messua limbata (Banks, 1898) – United States, Mexico
 Messua moma (F. O. P.-Cambridge, 1901) – Guatemala to Guyana
 Messua octonotata (F. O. P.-Cambridge, 1901) – Central America
 Messua pura (Bryant, 1948) – Mexico
 Messua tridentata (F. O. P.-Cambridge, 1901) – Mexico

References

Salticidae
Salticidae genera
Spiders of North America